The A1098 is a secondary route in North East Lincolnshire It is a very short but major 4.3 miles (6.9 km) of road.  It runs from the A180 road and A46 road at Issacs hill roundabout to Tollbar Roundabout with the A16 road and the B1219 road to Waltham.

Route
The A1098 starts at Issacs hill roundabout then follows up the hill to the High Street now it follows the coast on Alexandra road until at a mini roundabout it turns right down Queens Pareade. It goes in a straight line for about a mile past Cleethorpes Academy toward Hewitts Circus where it meats the A1031 road now it goes straight on past Tesco to New Waltham Traffic Lights where it turns into New Waltham. Next you come to a roundabout with the B1219 where it turns right follows that road until its end at Tollbar Academy.

Major junctions

Roads in Lincolnshire